The Bracknell Wasps are an ice hockey team from Bracknell, England that compete in the NIHL 2 South East Division. They are a minor league affiliate of the Bracknell Bees, who play in the NIHL National Division.

Season-by-season record

Club roster 2020–21

2020/21 Outgoing

References

External links 
 

Ice hockey teams in England
Sport in Bracknell